Bedlam is a young adult novel by Ally Kennen, published on 5 January 2009. It was nominated for the 2010 Carnegie Medal.

Plot 
When Lexi Juby arrives in the boring village where her mother lives, she thinks that she will die there from  boredom. But soon more happens than she'd like. While searching for her mother's missing dog, the 16-year-old got lost in the wood. Suddenly a huge wild dog with foaming at the mouth was standing in front of her, the purest tremendously! And it bites her. Despair, Lexi runs away, and reaches a half-ruined, weird building. She breaks out through the rotten floor and lands in a fetid broth. Beside of her, a rat cadaver was floating. The young exhausted girl won't be able to survive  in the ice cold water very long...

Unfinished Plot

References

2009 British novels
British young adult novels
Novels by Ally Kennen